Full Throttle as a proper noun is an allusion to wide open throttle (full throttle) on an engine. It may refer to:

Gaming
 Full Throttle (1984 video game), a 1984 video game released by Micromega
 Full Throttle (1987 video game), a 1987 racing arcade game by Taito
 Full Throttle: All-American Racing, a 1994 racing game for the Super NES
 Full Throttle (1995 video game), a 1995 video game released by LucasArts
 American Chopper 2: Full Throttle, a 2005 video game based on the American Chopper TV series

Film
 Charlie's Angels: Full Throttle, a 2003 American film
 Full Throttle (film), a 1995 Hong Kong film
 Full Throttle a 1995 film about Tim Birkin

Other
 Full Throttle (drink), an energy drink from The Coca-Cola Company
 Full Throttle (roller coaster), a roller coaster at Six Flags Magic Mountain
 NHRA Full Throttle Drag Racing Series, National Hot Rod Association-sanctioned drag racing championship
 Full Throttle Saloon, an American reality television series airing on the truTV network
 Full Throttle, a 2019 collection of novelettes and short stories by Joe Hill (writer)

See also
Throttle (disambiguation)